The 8th Psychological Operations Group (Airborne) or 8th POG(A) is one of the United States Army's active Psychological Operations units alongside the 4th Psychological Operations Group (Airborne). The unit was activated August 26, 2011. The activation ceremony was held on Meadows Field at the U.S. Army Special Operations Command headquarters. Lt. Gen. John F. Mulholland, Jr., served as a host. The 8th Group assumed responsibility for the 1st, 5th and 9th Psychological Operations battalions.  The unit is based at Fort Bragg, North Carolina and is a part of the 1st Special Forces Command (Airborne).

As of June 2015, both the 4th POG(A) and the new 8th POG(A) are operational.  However, the group's former parent unit (originally envisioned as a Brigadier General-level command) known as Military Information Support Operations Command (MISOC) (Airborne) and created at the same time as 8th MISG, in 2011, enjoyed only a very brief operational existence before being dissolved in 2014.  The MISOC(A) exists now only as a historical footnote. The 4th POG(A) and 8th POG(A) were subsequently reassigned under the newly established 1st Special Forces Command (Airborne) (SFC(A)), under U.S. Army Special Operations Command (USASOC).

Campaign participation credits
The unit has not participated in any military campaigns yet.

Organization
8th POG(A) currently consists of a headquarters company, two regional psychological operations battalions (or POBs), and one tactical psychological operations battalion.  The regional psychological operations battalions are regionally oriented and support the regional combatant commands in the planning and production of MISO programs:

 1st POB(A) – United States Southern Command (USSOUTHCOM)
Organized 8 November 1950 in the Regular Army at Fort Riley, Kansas, as Headquarters and Headquarters Company, 1st Radio Broadcasting and Leaflet Group.
Reorganized and redesignated 1 September 1951 as Headquarters and Headquarters Company, 1st Radio Broadcasting and Leaflet Group, 8239th Army Unit.
Consolidated 21 February 1955 with Headquarters and Headquarters Company, 1st Radio Broadcasting and Leaflet Battalion (constituted 30 November 1954 in the Regular Army) and consolidated unit designated as Headquarters and Headquarters Company, 1st Radio Broadcasting and Leaflet Battalion; concurrently reorganized at Fort Bragg, North Carolina.
Reorganized and redesignated 24 June 1960 as Headquarters and Headquarters Company, 1st Psychological Warfare Battalion. Reorganized and redesignated 20 December 1965 as the 1st Psychological Operations Battalion.
Reorganized and redesignated 16 March 1990 as Headquarters and Headquarters Company, 1st Psychological Operations Battalion.
Reorganized and redesignated 16 November 1995 as Headquarters, Headquarters and Support Company, 1st Psychological Operations Battalion.

 5th POB(A) – United States Pacific Command (USPACOM)
Constituted 3 March 1951 in the Regular Army as the 5th Loudspeaker and Leaflet Company, Army.
Activated 19 March 1951 at Fort Riley, Kansas
Reorganized and redesignated 8 June 1953 as the 5th Loudspeaker and Leaflet Company
Reorganized and redesignated 24 June 1961 as the 5th Psychological Warfare Company

Reorganized and redesignated 25 June 1965 as the 5th Psychological Operations Battalion
Inactivated 20 June 1975 in Germany
Redesignated 30 December 1975 as the 5th Psychological Operations Group; concurrently withdrawn from the Regular Army, allotted to the Army Reserve, and activated at Upper Marlboro, Maryland
Reorganized and redesignated 18 September 1990 as Headquarters and Headquarters Company, 5th Psychological Operations Group
Inactivated 15 September 1994 at Upper Marlboro, Maryland
Redesignated 18 November 2003 as Headquarters, Headquarters and Service Company, 5th Psychological Operations Battalion, withdrawn from the Army Reserve, and allotted to the Regular Army (organic elements concurrently constituted)
Battalion activated 16 October 2004 at Fort Bragg, North Carolina

 9th POB(A) – (Tactical)
This is the Tactical PSYOP element and supports ground commanders in the planning and production of MISO programs.
Constituted 14 April 1952 in the Regular Army as the 9th Loudspeaker and Leaflet Company, Army.
Activated 26 April 1952 at Fort Riley, Kansas
Reorganized and redesignated 27 May 1953 as the 9th Loudspeaker and Leaflet Company
Inactivated 25 September 1953 at Fort Bragg, North Carolina
Redesignated 22 March 1963 as the 9th Psychological Warfare Company
Activated 1 April 1963 in the Panama Canal Zone
Reorganized and redesignated 1 April 1967 as the 9th Psychological Operations Battalion
Inactivated 31 December 1974 in the Panama Canal Zone
Activated 15 April 1985 at Fort Bragg, North Carolina
Reorganized and redesignated 16 March 1990 as Headquarters and Headquarters Company, 9th Psychological Operations Battalion
Reorganized and redesignated 16 November 1995 as Headquarters, Headquarters and Service Company, 9th Psychological Operations Battalion (organic elements concurrently constituted and activated with personnel from provisional units)

See also
Psychological Operations (United States)

References

External links
 MEDIA ADVISORY:  8th Military Information Support Group (Airborne) Activation Ceremony
 8th Military Information Support Group (Airborne) Activation Ceremony

008
Psychological Operations 008